Autio is a surname. Notable people with the surname include:

Aino Autio (born 1932), Finnish sprinter
Asko Autio (born 1953), Finnish cross-country skier
Kaarina Autio (1941–2013), Finnish gymnast
Karen Autio, Finnish-Canadian writer
Lela Autio (1927–2016), American painter and sculptor
Narelle Autio (born 1969), Australian photographer
Rudy Autio (1926–2007), American sculptor
Veli Autio (1909–1993), Finnish rower